Don Bahnuik (born August 18, 1944) is a former professional Canadian football player. He played defensive tackle for the Saskatchewan Roughriders of the Canadian Football League from 1966 to 1974. He was part of the 1966 Grey Cup championship team.

References

Players of Canadian football from Saskatchewan
Saskatchewan Roughriders players
1944 births
Living people